Duckweed (lit. Ride the Winds, Break the Waves) is a 2017 Chinese drama film directed by Han Han and starring Deng Chao, Eddie Peng, Zhao Liying and Dong Zijian. It was released on January 28, 2017.

Plot
The film tells the story about the reconciliation between a father and his son. Ah Lang, a youth from a small town, thinks that his father Ah Zheng never understood his occupation and life. In a fateful occurrence, he is able to experience his father's legendary and interesting life in the past.

Movie started with Xu Tailang (Deng Chao) winning the 2022 China Rally Championship as his aging father, Xu Zhengtai (Eddie Peng) watches. Following this, while taking his father for a speed drive an oncoming train crashes into the side at rear end of his car as it jumps over the railway track As he lies on the gurney being pushed along the corridor of a hospital, he sees himself transported back in time to 1998 in the town where he was born. Thus, begins his comical adventures with his young father (Eddie Peng) and the people during that time period, at the same time meeting his mother whom he has never seen in person because she committed suicide due to postpartum depression after  giving birth to him. Through it all, he learns how his father lived his life then, how much he loved his mother (Zanilia Zhao), why he went to prison for six years, understands his father better and gains respect for him.

Cast
Starring
 Deng Chao as Xu Tailang 
 Eddie Peng as Xu Zhengtai
 Zhao Liying as Xiao Hua 
Special invitation
 Dong Zijian
 Zack Gao
 Zhang Benyu
Special appearance
 Li Ronghao
 Mason Lee
Guest appearance
 Chin Shih-chieh (credited as King Shihchieh)
 Fang Li
 Joshua Yi
 Alice Xiong
 Sun Yihan
 Li Chunai

Critical reception
The film received positive reviews both in China and internationally. On Rotten Tomatoes it has a score of 83% based on reviews from 6 critics. Maggie Lee of Variety reported " More relaxed and carefree than any of the Lunar New Year blockbusters jostling for the holiday crowd, the film is sprinkled with witty grace notes and is crowd-pleasing without being too ingratiating or idiotic."

Box office
The film became one of the highest grossing Chinese films of the year, making one billion yuan in less than one month after being released.

Awards and nominations

References

External links
 

Chinese drama films
2017 films
2010s Mandarin-language films
Films about time travel
Films set in 1998
Films set in 2022
Films set in Shanghai
Films shot in Shanghai
2017 drama films